The 1967 United States Road Racing Championship season was the fifth season of the Sports Car Club of America's United States Road Racing Championship. It began April 23, 1967, and ended August 20, 1967, after eight races.  Mark Donohue won the season championship.

Schedule

Season results
Overall winners in bold.

External links
World Sports Racing Prototypes: USRRC 1967
Racing Sports Cars: USRRC archive

United States Road Racing Championship
United States Road Racing Championship